The Bridges Point 24 is an American trailerable sailboat that was designed by Joel White as a daysailer and cruiser and first built in 1985.

Production
The design was built by Bridges Point Boatyard, starting in 1985 and later by the Bridges Point Boat Company in Bar Harbor, Maine, United States and remains in production.

The boat was originally a 1984 design commission by Wade Dow, a local lobster fisherman, who wanted a boat to sail in the off-season, with an emphasis on traditional aesthetics. Dow put the boat into production and produced 80 examples over 25 years. In 2008, with waning demand, the molds were put into storage.

In 2012 Dow offered the molds to  Jock Williams of the John Williams Boat Company to restart production, but Williams declined. The molds were instead purchased by an employee of his, Bill Wright, the production department manager, who formed the Bridges Point Boat Company to produce the design.

Design
The Bridges Point 24 is a recreational keelboat, built predominantly of seven-layer, hand laid fiberglass, with extensive wood trim. It has a fractional sloop rig; a spooned, raked stem; a raised counter, angled transom; a lazarette; a keel-mounted rudder controlled by a tiller and a fixed long keel. It displaces  and carries  of lead ballast.

The boat has a choice of inboard Yanmar diesel engines or gasoline engines, or  outboard motors for docking and maneuvering. If an outboard motor is fitted it is mounted in a stern well.

The design has sleeping accommodation for four people, with a double "V"-berth in the bow cabin and two quarter berths aft, under the cockpit. The galley is located on the port side just forward of the companionway ladder. The galley is equipped with a two-burner stove and a sink, with an icebox optional. The head is portable type.

During early production a daysailer or cruiser option was offered. The former has a longer cockpit and smaller cabin. Kits for amateur completion were also offered.

Operational history
The boat is supported by an active class club that organizes racing events, the Bridges Point Sailing Club.

In a 2010 review of the Bridges Point Boatyard model, Steve Henkel wrote, "Best features: This boat features very high quality construction in the Maine boatyard tradition. If you buy new, you can have pretty much whatever kind of boat you want. Worst feature: New or used, you'd better bring your checkbook with
you—the one for the account with lots of disposable cash."

See also
List of sailing boat types

References

External links

Old official Bridges Point Boatyard website archives on Archive.org

Keelboats
1980s sailboat type designs
Sailing yachts
Trailer sailers
Sailboat type designs by Joel White
Sailboat types built by Bridges Point Boat Company
Sailboat types built by Bridges Point Boatyard